Err is a commune in the Pyrénées-Orientales department in southern France.

Toponymy
The onomastics of the town name, first attested as Ezerre in 839 AD amongst many later forms, is ultimately mysterious. Linguists generally agree it dates before the dominance of Celtic languages and Latin in ancient Gaul (a dominant hypothesis being a Basque-related Pre-Indo-European name; also see Old European hydronymy). Compare the etymology of  similarly-sounding nearby Ur.

Geography 
Err is located in the canton of Les Pyrénées catalanes and in the arrondissement of Prades. Err station has rail connections to Villefranche-de-Conflent and Latour-de-Carol.

Population

See also
Communes of the Pyrénées-Orientales department

References

Communes of Pyrénées-Orientales